Annika Beck was the defending champion, having won the event in 2012, but retired after losing the first set of her semifinal against Kristýna Plíšková.

Marta Sirotkina won the tournament, defeating Plíšková in the final, 6–7(5–7), 6–3, 7–6(8–6).

Seeds

Main draw

Finals

Top half

Bottom half

References 
 Main draw

2013 ITF Women's Circuit